Fredrik Lindgren may refer to:

Fredrik Lindgren (musician) (born 1971), Swedish musician
Fredrik Lindgren (ice hockey) (born 1980), Swedish ice hockey player
Fredrik Lindgren (speedway rider) (born 1985), Swedish motorcycle speedway rider
Fredrik Lindgren (golfer) (born 1966), Swedish golfer
Fredrik Lindgren (floorballer) (born 1985), Swedish floorball player for Storvreta IBK